Limacina trochiformis is a species of gastropods belonging to the family Limacinidae.

The species has almost cosmopolitan distribution.

References

Limacinidae